The C F Orr Stakes is a Melbourne Racing Club Group 1 Thoroughbred horse race at Weight for Age, run over a distance of 1400 metres at Caulfield Racecourse, Melbourne, Victoria, Australia in February. Total prize money is A$750,000.

History
The race is named in honour of Charles F. Orr, a former chairman and secretary  of the Williamstown Racing Club. The race was originally run at the now-defunct Williamstown Racecourse.

The race often attracts the best horses in Australia, as they start their autumn campaigns.

Distance
1925–1956 - 1 mile (~1600m)
1957–1960 - 7 furlongs (~1400m)
1961–1963 - 1 mile (~1600m)
1964–1972 - 7 furlongs (~1400m)
1973 onwards - 1400 metres

Grade
1925–1978 - Principal Race
1979–1992 - Group 2
1993 onwards Group 1

Venue
1925–1940 - Williamstown Racecourse 
1941–1942 - Moonee Valley Racecourse 
1943 -Flemington Racecourse 
1944 -Moonee Valley Racecourse 
1945 -Flemington Racecourse 
1946–1948 - Moonee Valley Racecourse 
1949–1965 - Caulfield Racecourse 
1966–1985 - Sandown Racecourse
1986 - Caulfield Racecourse 
1987–1996 - Sandown Racecourse
1997–2022 - Caulfield Racecourse
2023 - Sandown Racecourse

Conditions
1925–1942 - WFA with penalties 
1943–1945 - handicap conditions 
1946 onwards - WFA

Winners

 2023 – Jacquinot 
 2022 – Tofane 
 2021 – Streets of Avalon 
 2020 – Alabama Express 
 2019 – Manuel
 2018 – Hartnell
 2017 – Black Heart Bart
 2016 – Suavito
 2015  – Dissident
 2014  – Moment Of Change
 2013  – All Too Hard
 2012  – Black Caviar
 2011  – Typhoon Tracy
 2010  – Typhoon Tracy
 2009  – Maldivian
 2008  – Shinzig
 2007  – El Segundo
 2006  – Perfect Promise
 2005  – Elvstroem
 2004  – Lonhro
 2003  – Yell
 2002  – Barkada
 2001  – Desert Sky
 2000  – Redoute's Choice
 1999  – Grand Archway
 1998  – Special Dane
 1997  – Saintly
 1996  – Racer's Edge
 1995  – Jeune
 1994  – Primacy
 1993  – Durbridge
 1992  – Let's Elope
 1991  – Planet Ruler
 1990  – Vo Rogue
 1989  – Vo Rogue
 1988  – Vo Rogue
 1987  – At Talaq
 1986  – Delightful Belle
 1985  – Fine Offer
 1984  – Qubeau
 1983  – Torbek
 1982  – Lawman
 1981  – Manikato 
 1980  – Manikato
 1979  – Manikato
 1978  – Hyperno
 1977  – Surround
 1976  – Plush
 1975  – Leilani
 1974  – All Shot
 1973  – Longfella
 1972  – Abdul
 1971  – Black Onyx
 1970  – Crewman
 1969  – Fileur
 1968  – Winfreux
 1967  – Tobin Bronze
 1966  – Rio
 1965  – Future
 1964  – Havelock
 1963  – Aquanita
 1962  – Wenona Girl
 1961  – Anonyme
 1960  – Lord
 1959  – Lord
 1958  – Highfire
 1957  – Golden Doubles
 1956  – Rising Fast
 1955  – Prince Cortauld
 1954  – Flying Halo
 1953  – Ellerslie
 1952  – Grey Boots
 1951  – Comic Court
 1950  – St. Razzle
 1949  – Ungar
 1948  – St. Fairy
 1947  – Attley
 1946  – Flight
 1945  – Drum Net
 1944  – Lawrence
 1943  – Primavera
 1942  – Burrabil
 1941  – Mildura
 1940  – High Caste
 1939  – Manolive
 1938  – Hua
 1937  – Iva
 1936  – Cardinal
 1935  – Break Up
 1934  – Gaine Carrington
 1933  – Liberal
 1932  – Greenline
 1931  – Byron 
 1930  – Gallopade
 1929  – Gothic
 1928  – Sailing Home
 1927  – Heroic
 1926  – Whittier
 1925  – The Night Patrol

See also
 List of Australian Group races
 Group races

References

Open mile category horse races
Group 1 stakes races in Australia
Caulfield Racecourse